The War of Hum was fought in 1326–1329 between the Banate of Bosnia under Stephen II Kotromanić and the Kingdom of Serbia under Stefan Dečanski Nemanjić.

Background
Branivoje who served King Stefan Milutin Nemanjić (r. 1282–1321) was given the rule of Ston and Pelješac. His family had by 1325 emerged as the strongest in Zahumlje (or Hum). Probably at their highest point they ruled from Cetina river to the town of Kotor. Though nominal vassals of Serbia, the Branivojević family attacked Serbian interests and other local nobles of Hum, who in 1326 turned against Serbia and the Branivojevići. The Hum nobility approached Stjepan Kotromanić II, the ban of Bosnia, who then entered conflict with Serbia.

History

In 1326, Ban Stephen II attacked Serbia in a military alliance with the Republic of Ragusa and conquered Zahumlje, gaining access to the Adriatic Sea and including a large Serbian Orthodox Christian population and the Serbian Orthodox Church. This changed the balance of religion in Bosnia, as the Bosnian Bogumils had lost its majority in the realm. He also expanded into Završje, including the Fields of Glamoč, Duvanj and Livanj. The province of Zahumlje was ruled by the Serbian noble family of Branivojević who had tricked Stefan Dečanski's vassal Prince, Crep, who was a close friend, so King Stefan had no desire to defend those areas from Ban Stephen's forces.

Bosnia controlled the coast from the border with Ragusa across Neretva to Omiš. Ban Stephen II killed two members of the Branivojević, while Branko Branivojević fled to Serbia and sought help from King Stefan and then headed to Ragusa, from where he proceeded to Ston. Ban Stephen pursued Branko, but eventually the Ragusan forces caught the last of the four Branivojević brothers. The Bosnian titles included Lord of the Hum Land ever after. Ban Stephen became the ruler of all the lands from Cetina to Neretva with the exception of Omiš, which was taken by the Hungarians.

In 1329, Ban Stephen II of Kotroman pushed another military attempt into Serbia, assaulting Lord Vitomir of Trebinje and Konavli, but the main portion of his force was defeated by the Young King Stefan Dušan who commanded the forces of King Stefan of Dečani at Pribojska Banja. The Ban's horse was killed in the battle, and he would have lost his life if his vassal Vuk Vukoslavić had not given him his own horse. By doing so, Vuk sacrificed his own life, and was killed in open battle. Thus the Ban managed to add Nevesinje and parts of Zagorje to his realm.

Although the Zahumljans mostly accepted the Ban's rule, some resisted, like Petar Toljenović who ruled the Seaside from his capital in Popovo; he was the grandson of the famous Zachlumian Prince Andrew. Petar raised a rebellion, wishing either more autonomy or total independence and the eventual restoration of the conquered territories to Serbia. He lost a battle against Ban Stephen II and was imprisoned and put in irons. Stephen had him thrown with his horse off a cliff. Peter survived for a full hour after the fall.

The Ban's vassal that governed Zahumlje started to raid Ragusan trade routes, which worsened Bosnian-Ragusan relations that were very high during the conquest of Zahumlje. To make matters worse, Ban Stephen II asked Ragusa to pay him the old traditional mogorish tax that they traditionally paid to the Serbian rulers and even asked them to recognize his supreme rule. The Republic of Ragusa refused outright.

References

Sources

Wars involving medieval Serbian states
14th century in Bosnia
Kotromanić dynasty
Nemanjić dynasty
Medieval Herzegovina
1320s in Europe
Military history of the Republic of Ragusa
14th-century military history of Croatia
Wars involving medieval Bosnian state